Barry D. Kramer (born November 10, 1942) is an American retired professional basketball player, a retired jurist, and an attorney. Kramer is known for being a Parade All-American basketball player for Linton High School in Schenectady, New York and for being an All-American collegiate basketball player for New York University. Following his playing career, he served as a trial court judge in the New York state court system.

Basketball career
A 6'4" (1.93 m), 200-pound guard–forward, Kramer played for Linton High School in Schenectady, New York. Future NBA basketball player and coach Pat Riley was a freshman at Linton when Kramer was a senior. Kramer won two Section II championships at Linton and was named a first-team Parade All-American in 1960. He was later inducted into the Schenectady School District Hall of Fame.

After graduating from Linton in 1960, Kramer attended New York University (NYU). Kramer was named a consensus first-team All-American as a junior in 1963. That year, Kramer was the second-leading scorer in college basketball, averaging 29.3 points per game; he also received the Haggerty Award as the best college basketball player in the New York City metropolitan area. Kramer played in the 1963 NCAA tournament and the 1964 NIT with NYU. As a senior in the 1963–64 season, Kramer was named a third-team All-American by both the Associated Press and the National Association of Basketball Coaches. He was later named to the NYU Athletic Hall of Fame.

Kramer was selected by the San Francisco Warriors with the sixth pick in the 1964 NBA draft. He played one season in the NBA, a portion of which he spent playing for the Warriors and a portion of which he spent playing for the New York Knicks. Kramer averaged 3.6 points per game that season.  Kramer later played in the rival American Basketball Association with the New York Nets in the 1969–1970 season.

In 2009, Kramer was selected by the Capital District Basketball Hall of Fame as the premier area basketball player over the past 50 years. He was inducted into the National Jewish Sports Hall of Fame in 2014.

Legal and judicial career
Kramer became an attorney after graduating from Albany Law School in 1968; he finished second in his class. He was appointed to a Surrogate Court judgeship in Schenectady, New York by Gov. Mario Cuomo in 1993, was elected to the post later that year, and was re-elected in 2003. In November 2009, Kramer was elected as a Justice of the New York State Supreme Court–a trial-level court–in New York's Fourth Judicial District. After reaching the mandatory retirement age for New York judges in 2012, Kramer continued to serve on the court through a certification process available to retired judges. Kramer joined the law firm of McNamee Lochner P.C. in 2019.

References

1942 births
Living people
Albany Law School alumni
All-American college men's basketball players
American men's basketball players
Basketball players from New York (state)
Jewish American sportspeople
Jewish men's basketball players
New York Knicks players
New York Nets players
NYU Violets men's basketball players
Parade High School All-Americans (boys' basketball)
San Francisco Warriors draft picks
San Francisco Warriors players
Shooting guards
Small forwards
Sportspeople from Schenectady, New York
21st-century American Jews